Wolfgang Schad (born 27 July 1935 in Biberach an der Riß) is a German evolutionary biologist, anthroposophist and goetheanist. (died 15 October 2022 in Witten, Germany)

Life 
Schad studied biology, chemistry, physics and education. In the early years of his professional career, he was a teacher at Waldorf schools. After many years as a Waldorf teacher at the Goetheschule in Pforzheim, Wolfgang Schad became a lecturer at the Seminar for Waldorf Education at the Freie Hochschule Stuttgart in 1975. In addition, he was a member of staff at the Educational Research Centre of the Bund der Freien Waldorfschulen in Stuttgart, which he temporarily directed.

In 1992 he founded the Institute for Evolutionary Biology and Morphology at Witten/Herdecke University, which he directed until 2005. The foundation of the chair was supported by the patron Karl Ludwig Schweisfurth, after whom the institute was named.

His son Albrecht Schad also became a Waldorf teacher and, after his father's departure, also a lecturer at the Freie Hochschule Stuttgart in the training for teachers at Waldorf schools.<ref>Dozenten der Freien Hochschule Stuttgart - Prof. Dr. Albrecht Schad</ref>

Wolfgang Schad has since retired and Bernd Rosslenbroich has taken over as head of the institute.University of Witten/Herdecke Faculty of Health: Institute of Evolutionary Biology

 Scientific work 
In his major work Threefoldness in Humans and Mammals; Toward a Biology of Form, Schad applied Rudolf Steiner’s approach from his idea of the Threefold structure of the human organism in the sense of a comparative morphology to mammals.Wolfgang Schad’s study Threefoldness in Humans and Mammals; Toward a Biology of Form.

From 1982 to 1985 Schad published four anthologies of works by various authors under the title Goetheanist Natural Science in the (anthroposophical) Verlag Freies Geistesleben & Urachhaus. With this he established the term Goetheanism in the environment of anthroposophy. Numerous works by Schad appeared in anthroposophical journals, only occasionally did he write for others. As head of the Institute of Evolutionary Biology, he became editor of the Wissenschaftlichen Schriftenreihe des Instituts für Evolutionsbiologie und Morphologie Universität Witten/Herdecke (Scientific Series of the Institute of Evolutionary Biology and Morphology University of Witten/Herdecke).The Potential Cultural Landscape Vegetation in the Bergisch-Märkische Hügelland

In his research in evolutionary biology, Schad came to the conclusion that evolutionary developments would not take place by coincidence alone, but also not by teleology, but that in many living beings there would live a piece of inner autonomy, which, if the epigenetic changes are inherited by their offspring, could lead them to new forms of development.

"The element of chance frees the course of evolution from the teleological determinism of any plan. In the meantime, quantum and chaos theory have also freed it from the causal determinism in its claim to absoluteness." (Wolfgang Schad, 2009)

His central topics include the temporal shapes in the evolution of animals and humans and heterochrony.Wolfgang Schad: Evolutionary Biology and Education. In: Education and Upbringing, vol. 47, issue 4, 1994. In retirement, he authored several more books published by Urachhausverlag.

 Publications (selection) 
 Man and mammals: Toward a biology of form. Verlag: Waldorf Press, 1977, ISBN 978-0-91461-410-4.
 Expanded new edition (with Heinrich Brettschneider and Albrecht Schad), Stuttgart 2012.
 Threefoldness in Humans and Mammals: Toward a Biology of Form. Adonis Press 2021. ISBN 978-0-93277-664-8
 Die Vorgeburtlichkeit des Menschen – Der Entwicklungsgedanke in der Embryologie. (The Pre-natality of Man - The idea of development in embryology). Urachhaus, Stuttgart 1982, ISBN 978-3-87838-351-2
 Vom Leben im Lichtraum. In: Goetheanistische Naturwissenschaft, vol. 3 Zoology, Stuttgart 1983, pp. 42–49.
 Stauphänomene am menschlichen Knochenbau. (Congestion Phenomena on the Human Bone Structure). In: Goetheanistische Naturwissenschaft, vol. 4 Anthropology, Stuttgart 1985, pp. 9–29.
 Gestaltmotive fossiler Menschenformen. In: Goetheanistische Naturwissenschaft, vol. 4 Anthropology, Stuttgart 1985, pp. 57–152.
 Die Ohrorganisation. (The ear organisation). In: Goetheanistische Naturwissenschaft, vol. 4 Anthropology, Stuttgart 1985, pp. 174–189.
 Dynamische Morphologie von Herz und Kreislauf. (Dynamic morphology of the heart and circulation.) Goetheanistische Naturwissenschaft, vol. 4 Anthropology, Stuttgart 1985, pp. 190–206.
 Andreas Suchantke, Wolfgang Schad: Ökologie. Stuttgart 1998, ISBN 978-3-77250-909-4.
 Goethes Weltkultur (= Gesammelte Schriften 1). (Goethe's World Culture (= Collected Writings 1). Stuttgart 2007, ISBN 978-3-77251-971-0.
 Evolution als Verständnisprinzip in Kosmos, Mensch und Natur. (Evolution as a principle of understanding in cosmos, man and nature). Stuttgart 2009, ISBN 978-3-77251-809-6.
 Zeitbindung in Natur, Kultur und Geist. (Time Binding in Nature, Culture and Spirit). Stuttgart 2016. ISBN 978-3-7725-1402-9. 
 Was ist Zeit? – Die Welt zwischen Wesen und Erscheinung. (What is Time? - The world between being and appearance). Stuttgart 2017, ISBN 978-3-77251-281-0.
 Der Darwinismus im Rückblick und Vorblick – Was den Menschen zum Menschen machte. (Darwinism in retrospect and foresight - What made man man). Stuttgart 2018. ISBN 978-3-77251-403-6.
 Weltkinderkunde (Science of world's children). Stuttgart 2018. ISBN 978-3-77252-820-0

External links

References 

1935 births
Evolutionary biologists
Living people